Paul Edwards may refer to:

Sports
Paul Edwards (boxer) (born 1986), English flyweight boxer
Paul Edwards (footballer, born 1947), English footballer who played for Manchester United, Oldham Athletic, and Stockport County
Paul Edwards (footballer, born 1963), English footballer who played for West Brom and Wolves
Paul Edwards (footballer, born 1965), English footballer who played for Crewe and Shrewsbury
Paul Edwards (footballer, born 1980), English footballer
Paul Edwards (footballer, born 1982), former English footballer for Crewe Alexandra
Paul Edwards (shot putter) (born 1959), Welsh shot putter

Other people
Paul Edwards (composer) (born 1955), English composer and organist
Paul S. Edwards, editor with the Deseret News
Paul Edwards (literary scholar) (1926–1992), British literary historian
Paul Edwards (philosopher) (1923–2004), Austrian-American philosopher
Paul Edwards (politician) (born 1961), politician in Manitoba, Canada